James Walton (1479/80–1546/50), of Preston, Lancashire, was an English politician.

Career
He was Mayor of Preston in 1526–27, ?1532–33, ?1533–34 and 1546.

He was a Member (MP) of the Parliament of England for Preston in 1529.

References

1480 births
16th-century deaths
Mayors of Preston, Lancashire
English MPs 1529–1536